This is a list of publicly accessible, motorable passes in the Limpopo Province, South Africa.
See Mountain Passes of South Africa

Limpopo
Mountain passes
Mountain passes of Limpopo
Mountain passes of Limpopo